Raymond Willard Karst (December 31, 1902 – October 4, 1987) was a U.S. Representative from Missouri.

Born in South St. Louis, Missouri, Karst attended Wyman grade school and St. Louis Academy.
He was graduated from the law school of St. Louis University in 1927.
He was admitted to the bar in 1926 and commenced the practice of law in St. Louis, Missouri.
He served as member of the State house of representatives in 1935 and 1936.
Provisional city judge and judge of Court of Criminal Correction in 1936–1940.
He served as a captain, Ordnance Department, United States Army from 1942 to 1945.

Karst was elected as a Democrat to the Eighty-first Congress (January 3, 1949 – January 3, 1951).
He was an unsuccessful candidate for re-election in 1950 to the Eighty-second Congress.
He was appointed general counsel with Economic Stabilization Agency and later acting administrator.
In 1955, he resumed his law practice in Clayton, Missouri.
He served as chairman of the board of Karst Enterprises.
He was a resident of Kirkwood, Missouri until his death.

References

1902 births
1987 deaths
United States Army officers
Saint Louis University School of Law alumni
Democratic Party members of the United States House of Representatives from Missouri
Democratic Party members of the Missouri House of Representatives
20th-century American politicians